Irene is an unincorporated community in Boone County, Illinois, United States. Irene is located along a railroad line southeast of Cherry Valley.

References

Unincorporated communities in Boone County, Illinois
Unincorporated communities in Illinois